Marian Wisniewski (1 February 1937 – 3 March 2022), known as Maryan Wisniewski, was a French footballer who played as a forward.

Life and career
Marian Wisniewski was born on 1 February 1937 in Calonne-Ricouart, Pas-de-Calais. He earned 33 caps and scored 12 goals for the France national team, and played in the 1958 FIFA World Cup when France finished third. He made his international debut on 3 April 1955, thus becoming the youngest footballer to play for France at the age of 18 years and 2 months.

Wisniewski died on 3 March 2022, at the age of 85, in Carpentras, Vaucluse. His grandnephew Jonathan Wisniewski is a former professional rugby union player.

References

External links

1937 births
2022 deaths
Sportspeople from Pas-de-Calais
French footballers
Association football forwards
RC Lens players
U.C. Sampdoria players
AS Saint-Étienne players
FC Sochaux-Montbéliard players
Grenoble Foot 38 players
Ligue 1 players
Ligue 2 players
Serie A players
France international footballers
1958 FIFA World Cup players
1960 European Nations' Cup players
French expatriate footballers
Expatriate footballers in Italy
French expatriate sportspeople in Italy
French people of Polish descent
Footballers from Hauts-de-France